Stardust is an Indian monthly Bollywood news and gossip magazine published in English and Hindi. It also sponsored the Stardust Awards. In 2016, Sumita Chakraborty was appointed as its editor.

History
The magazine is published by Mumbai-based Magna Publishing Co. Ltd. and was started by Nari Hira in 1971. It became popular under the editorship of noted journalist, author and columnist, Shobhaa De after 1995. The magazine has run a gossip column called "Neeta’s Natter" for many decades now. Amitabh Bachchan refused to be interviewed by the magazine for seven years. Many defamation lawsuits were filed against the magazine, most of which made no progress due to the "ambiguous defamation laws" of the country. The magazine was known for introducing Hinglish and for the covers that used headlines covering the scandals, coupled with pictures of the concerned celebrities.

See also
 Filmfare
 Filmindia
 Cine Blitz

References

External links
 
 Magna Publishing Co. Ltd. official site

Celebrity magazines
Stardust Awards
Film magazines published in India
Magazines established in 1971
1971 establishments in Maharashtra
English-language magazines published in India
Monthly magazines published in India
Mass media in Mumbai